The 2016 African Women's Handball Cup Winners' Cup was the 32nd edition, organized by the African Handball Confederation, under the auspices of the International Handball Federation, the handball sport governing body. The tournament was held from May 5–20, 2016 in one venue: the Salle Al Jadida, in Laayoune, Western Sahara, contested by 8 teams and won by Clube Desportivo Primeiro de Agosto of Angola thus successfully defending its tile.

Draw

Preliminary rounds

Times given below are in WET UTC+0.

Group A

* Note:  Advance to quarter-finals

Group B

* Note:  Advance to quarter-finals

Knockout stage
Championship bracket

5-8th bracket

Final standings

See also 
2016 African Women's Handball Champions League

References

External links 
 Tournament profile at goalzz.com
 

African Women's Handball Cup Winner's Cup
2016 in Moroccan sport
African Women's Handball Cup Winners' Cup